The Europe/Africa Zone was one of the three zones of the regional Davis Cup competition in 1989.

In the Europe/Africa Zone there were two different tiers, called groups, in which teams competed against each other to advance to the upper tier. Winners in Group I advanced to the World Group Qualifying Round, along with losing teams from the World Group first round. Teams who lost in the first round competed in the relegation play-offs, with winning teams remaining in Group I, whereas teams who lost their play-offs were relegated to the Europe/Africa Zone Group IIs in 1990.

Participating nations

Draw

  and  relegated to Group II in 1990.

First round

Zimbabwe vs. Hungary

Ireland vs. Finland

Portugal vs. Senegal

Second round

Switzerland vs. Romania

Hungary vs. Nigeria

Finland vs. Great Britain

Netherlands vs. Portugal

Relegation play-off

Ireland vs. Senegal

References

External links
Davis Cup official website

Davis Cup Europe/Africa Zone
Europe Africa Zone Group I